IN-7, IN 7, or IN7 may refer to:

 Indiana's 7th congressional district
 Indiana State Road 7